Arakaparampil Mathai "Arak" Mathai (born 28 April 1935) is an Indian mathematician who has worked in Statistics, Applied Analysis, Applications of special functions and Astrophysics. Mathai established the Centre for Mathematical Sciences, Palai, Kerala, India.

He has published more 25 books and more than 300 research publications.  In 1998 he received the Founder Recognition Award from the Statistical Society of Canada. He is a Fellow of the National Academy of Sciences, India and a Fellow of the Institute of Mathematical Statistics.

Early years
Mathai was born in Arakulam near Palai in the Idukki district of Kerala, India as the eldest son of Aley and Arakaparampil Mathai.  After completing his high school education in 1953 from St. Thomas High School, Palai, with record marks he joined St. Thomas College, Palai, and obtained his B Sc. degree in mathematics in 1957.  In 1959 he completed his master's degree in statistics from University of Kerala, Thiruvananthapuram, Kerala, India, with first class, first rank and gold medal.  Then he joined St. Thomas College, Palai, University of Kerala, as a lecturer in Statistics and served there till 1961.  He obtained Canadian Commonwealth scholarship in 1961 and went to University of Toronto, Canada, for completing his MA degree in mathematics in 1962.  He was awarded PhD from University of Toronto, Canada in 1964.  Then he joined McGill University, Canada as an assistant professor till 1968.  From 1968 to 1978 he was an associate professor there.  He became a full professor of McGill in 1979 and served the department of mathematics and statistics until 2000.  From 2000 onwards he was an emeritus professor of McGill University.

Selected publications
Random p-content of a p-parallelotope in Euclidean n-space, Advances in Applied Probability, 31(2), 343–354 (1999).
An Introduction to Geometrical Probability: Distributional Aspects with Applications, Gordon and Breach, Newark, (1999).
Jacobians of Matrix Transformations and Functions of Matrix Argument, World Scientific Publishing, New York, (1997).
Appell's and Humbert's functions of matrix arguments, Linear Algebra and Its Applications, 183, 202–221, (1993).
On non-central generalized Laplacianness of quadratic forms in normal variables, Journal of Multivariate Analysis, 45, 239–246, (1993).
(With S.B. Provost),	Quadratic Forms in random Variables: Theory and Applications, Marcel Dekker, New York, (1992).
On a system of differential equations connected with the gravitational instability in a multi-component medium in Newtonian cosmology, Studies in Applied Mathematics, 80, 75–93, (1989).
(With H.J. Haubold), Modern Problems in Nuclear and Neutrino Astrophysics, Akademie-Verlag, Berlin.
On a conjecture in geometric probability regarding asymptotic normality of a random simplex, Annals of Probability, 10, 247–251, (1982).
(With R.S. Katiyar), Exact percentage points for testing independence, Biometrika, 66, 353–356, (1979).
(With P.N. Rathie), Recent contributions to axiomatic definitions of information and statistical measures through functional equations. In, Essays in Probability and Statistics, Ikeda and others editors, Shinto, Tsusho, Tokyo, pp. 607–633,(1976).
(With T.A. Davis), Constructing the sunflower head, Mathematical Biosciences, 20, 117–133, (1974).

References

External links
A. M. Mathai personal webpage, Department of Mathematics, McGill University
Complete list of publications of A. M. Mathai

Selected Publications of A. M. Mathai

Academic staff of McGill University
20th-century Indian mathematicians
1935 births
Living people
University of Kerala alumni
People from Pala, Kerala
Fellows of the Institute of Mathematical Statistics
Scientists from Kerala
Indian statisticians